Iryna Glibko (born 18 February 1990) is a Ukrainian professional handballer who plays for Liga Națională club SCM Râmnicu Vâlcea and the Ukrainian national team.

Trophies 
Liga Națională:
Winner: 2015, 2019
Supercupa României: 
Winner: 2018 
Bucharest Trophy:
Winner: 2014

Individual awards
 Liga Națională Top Scorer: 2013, 2018
 Cupa României Top Scorer: 2018
 Liga Națională Left Back of the Season: 2019
 Liga Națională Foreign Player of the Season: 2019

References

External links
 Glibko living in the moment
 
		

Sportspeople from Odesa
1990 births
Living people
Ukrainian female handball players
Expatriate handball players
Ukrainian expatriate sportspeople in Romania 
SCM Râmnicu Vâlcea (handball) players